Michael Halvarson (born 30 July 1976, Stockholm) is a Swedish comedian, illusionist, and magician. His acts, centered on comedy, magic and stage pickpocketing, have time and again become known throughout the World. In 2007, he started an international career becoming the first Swedish comedian ever to perform in a show by the world-famous Cirque du Soleil in the show Koozå, with performers. In 2012, Halvarson performed as 'The Trickster' in the Singapore run of the renowned magic show, The Illusionists.

Halvarson made his professional stage début at the show restaurant Wallman's Golden Hits in Stockholm at the age of seventeen. Since then, he has worked at comedy clubs, guest starred in varieties, taken part in several radio and television shows and on the Nordic corporate-event circuit. Among other merits are a couple of Swedish music videos on the MTV chart as director and producer.

References

External links

Living people
1976 births
Swedish comedians